Antonio Alsúa Alonso (25 October 1919 – 4 March 1998) was a Spanish professional footballer, who played as a midfielder.

He became one of the most important players for Real Madrid CF in the 1940s, playing over 170 matches for the Spanish side and winning the Copa del Rey in 1946 and 1947.

He was the elder brother of Rafael Alsúa, who also played for Real Madrid but had longer spells with Real Sociedad and Racing Santander.

Honours
Real Madrid
Copa del Generalísimo: 1946, 1947
Copa Eva Duarte: 1947

References

Biography of Antonio Alsúa Alonso

External links
Antonio Alsúa at ABC

1919 births
1998 deaths
Spanish footballers
Real Madrid CF players
Footballers from the Basque Country (autonomous community)
La Liga players
Real Unión footballers
Deportivo Alavés players
Sportspeople from Irun
Association football midfielders
UE Lleida players
Gimnàstic de Tarragona footballers
Spanish football managers
Deportivo Alavés managers
Segunda División players